Mamas Gun is a British Soul/Pop band. It found early international success with a radio friendly soul pop sound. They made 5 full length albums with evolving personnel, reaching a sound rooted in classic soul with alternative/progressive leanings. Golden Days (2018) marked a major turning point, recording and producing it themselves.

History

Formation
The band was formed by Andy 'AP' Platts, the lead singer/composer/producer in 2007 and was joined by bassist 'Professor' Rex Horan, keyboardist Dave 'Eighties' Oliver, Terry 'Spiller' Lewis and drummer 'Union' Jack Pollitt after placing an ad on Myspace.com seeking musicians. The group name derives from the title of Erykah Badu's second album, Mama's Gun

In addition to their involvement with Mamas Gun, the band members continue to work in various other capacities ranging from songwriting to studio sessions and touring work. Platts' songwriting collaborators include Rod Temperton, John Oates and former Gil Scott-Heron collaborator, Brian Jackson. He has enjoyed chart success in South East Asia penning number 1 hits for Korean artists Park Hyo Shin, John Park and Japanese singer Tomohisa Yamashita. Since 2015 he has also been an active member of Young Gun Silver Fox alongside Shawn Lee (musician). Terry ‘Spiller’ Lewis has played for US songwriter / artist Leon Ware, Lewis Taylor and The Impressions.

Music

UK releases
Mamas Gun's first single, "Pots of Gold", was released in August 2008 on Candelion Records and was playlisted on BBC Radio 2. Following its success, Mamas Gun recorded their debut album Routes to Riches, seeing its release in October 2009. The album was co-produced by producer/engineer, Julian Simmons, mixed by Producer/Engineer Jack Joseph Puig at Ocean Way, Los Angeles and mastered by Bob Ludwig. In June 2011 Mamas Gun released The Life And Soul, produced by Martin Terefe and Andreas Olsson. It yielded the singles "On A String", "Reconnection" and "Only One". In 2014, Cheap Hotel spawned the singles "Red Cassette", "Hello Goodnight" and "Cheap Hotel". The album charted at number 29 in the Independent UK album chart. The band released the Room Service EP via a Pledge exclusive. In 2018, with drummer Chris Boot. They decided to self produce Golden Days mastered by Pierre and Shawn Lee. Singles included "London Girls", "I Need A Win", and "You Make My Life A Better Place". After the release of Golden Days, the band re-recorded the song "This Is The Day".

Japan releases
Routes To Riches, released in November 2009, achieved a number 3 sales position on the Japanese Billboard charts. The lead single from this album, "House on a Hill", was a number 2 hit on the Japanese Hot 100 singles chart and the most played song on Japanese radio in 2009.

Discography

Albums

Singles

International Releases

Videography

 "You Are the Music" (2009)
 "Let's Find a Way" (unofficial video) (2010)
 "Finger On It" (2010)
 "Pots of Gold" (2010)
 "On a String" (2011)
 "Reconnection" (2011)
 "Only One" (live) ft. Beverley Knight (2011)
 "Cheap Hotel" (2014)
 "Joy Rides" (2014)
 "Hello Goodnight" (2014)
 "Cheap Hotel" (2014)
 "London Girls" (2018)
 "I Need A Win" (2018)
 "On The Wire" (2018)
 "Party For One" (2022)

References

External links
 Mamas Gun Official Website
 

Musical groups from London
Ubiquity Records artists
Soul music
Love Da Records artists